Beit HaLevi (lit. House of the Levite) is a moshav in central Israel. Located in the Sharon plain near Netanya, it falls under the jurisdiction of Hefer Valley Regional Council.

History
The moshav was founded in 1945 by Jewish immigrants from the Balkans, and was named after Yehuda Halevi.

References

Moshavim
Populated places established in 1945
Populated places in Central District (Israel)
Yugoslav-Jewish culture in Israel
1945 establishments in Mandatory Palestine